Ihor Pokarynin (born 30 April 1981) is a football midfielder from Ukraine.

In 2006 his team FK Ventspils was the champions of Latvia.

References

External links
Statistics at FFU website

1981 births
Living people
Ukrainian footballers
FC Desna Chernihiv players
FC Desna-2 Chernihiv players
FK Ventspils players
Association football midfielders
Footballers from Odesa